The women's artistic team all-around competition at the 1956 Summer Olympics was held at the West Melbourne Stadium from 3 to 7 December. It was the fifth appearance of the event in the Olympics.

Competition format

Each nation entered a team of six gymnasts (with up to two alternates). All entrants performed both a compulsory exercise and a voluntary exercise for each apparatus. The top five individual scores in each exercise (that is, compulsory floor, voluntary floor, compulsory vault, etc.) were added to give a team score for that exercise. The eight team exercise scores were summed, along with the team portable apparatus event score, to give a team total.

No separate finals were contested.

Exercise scores ranged from 0 to 10, apparatus scores from 0 to 20, individual totals from 0 to 80, team exercise scores from 0 to 50, portable apparatus scores from 0 to 80, and team total scores from 0 to 480.

Results
The Soviet team won the gold medal, the Hungarian team won the silver, and the Romanian team won the bronze.

References

Women's artistic team all-around
1952
Women's events at the 1956 Summer Olympics